

1983

See also
1983 in Australia
1983 in Australian television

References

External links 
 Australian film at the Internet Movie Database

1983
Lists of 1983 films by country or language
Films